Jabal al-Druze was an autonomous state in the French Mandate of Syria from 1921 to 1936, designed to function as a government for the local Druze population under French oversight.

Nomenclature 

On 4 March 1922, it was proclaimed as the State of Souaida, after the capital As-Suwayda, but in 1927 it was renamed Jabal al-Druze or Jabal Druze State. The name comes from the Jabal al-Druze mountain.

History 

The Druze state was formed on 1 May 1921 in former Ottoman territory, while other statelets were installed in other parts of the Syrian mandate (e.g. the Alawite State in the Lattakia region). Jabal al-Druze was home to about 50,000 Druze. It was the first, and remains the only, autonomous entity to be populated and governed by Druze. The 1925 Syrian Revolution began in Jabal al-Druze under the leadership of Sultan al-Atrash, and quickly spread to Damascus and other non-Druze areas outside the Jabal al-Druze region. Protests against the division of Syrian territory into statelets were a main theme of Syrian anti-colonial nationalism, which eventually won the victory to reunite the entire French-mandated territory, except Lebanon (which had become independent) and Alexandretta, which was annexed to Turkey as the Hatay Province.

As a result of Syrian nationalist pressure, under the Franco-Syrian Treaty of 1936, Jabal al-Druze ceased to exist as an autonomous entity and was incorporated into Syria.

Governors 
Amir Salim Pasha al-Atrash (1 May 1921 – 15 September 1923)
Trenga (provisional) (September 1923 – 6 March 1924)
Gabriel Marie Victor Carbillet (6 March 1924 – 14 October 1925), provisional to 1 October 1924
Sultan Pasha al-Atrash (18 July 1925 – 1 June 1927), chief of state; in dissidence
Charles Andréa (15 October 1925 – 1927)
Marie Joseph Léon Augustin Henry (1927)
Abel Jean Ernest Clément-Grancourt (1927–1932)
Claude-Gabriel-Renaud Massiet (3 February 1932 – 28 January 1934)
Justin-Antoine Devicq (1934–1935)
Pierre-Joseph-François Tarrit (1935 – 2 December 1936)

See also 
Druze in Syria
Jaysh al-Muwahhideen

References

External links 
Syria at WorldStatesmen.org.
Map  at unimaps.com.

French Mandate for Syria and the Lebanon
Former countries in the Middle East
Former protectorates
History of the Druze
States and territories established in 1921
States and territories disestablished in 1936
Former countries of the interwar period
1936 disestablishments in Asia
1921 establishments in Asia
Druze in Syria